The butterflies of Finland include all species of butterflies (Papilionoidea) (including skippers, which were formerly considered a separate superfamily Hesperioidea but nowadays are included in Papilionoidea) which have been recorded in Finland. The local butterfly fauna includes 121 species of butterflies, 10 of which are skippers. However, some species have been reported only once.

, the butterfly fauna of Finland included two species classified as critically endangered (CR), 12 species as endangered (EN) and 10 species as vulnerable (VU). Out of all 26 lepidopteran species which are protected by law under the Nature Conservation Decree, 18 species appear on this list.

Butterflies (Papilionoidea) by family

Pieridae 
Coliadinae
 Colias crocea, dark clouded yellow
 Colias hecla sulitelma, northern clouded yellow
 Colias hyale, pale clouded yellow
 Colias palaeno, moorland clouded yellow
 Colias tyche werdandi, pale Arctic clouded yellow
 Gonepteryx rhamni, common brimstone
Dismorphiinae
 Leptidea juvernica
 Leptidea sinapis, wood white
Pierinae
 Anthocharis cardamines, orange tip
 Aporia crataegi, black-veined white
 Euchloe ausonia, eastern dappled white
 Pieris brassicae, large white
 Pieris napi, green-veined white
 Pieris rapae, small white
 Pontia callidice, lofty Bath white
 Pontia chloridice, lesser Bath white
 Pontia daplidice, Bath white

Papilionidae 
Papilioninae
 Iphiclides podalirius, scarce swallowtail
 Papilio machaon, Old World swallowtail
Parnassiinae
 Parnassius apollo, Apollo - protected by law
 Parnassius mnemosyne, clouded Apollo - protected by law

Lycaenidae 
Lycaeninae
 Lycaena dispar, large copper - protected by law
 Lycaena helle, violet copper - protected by law
 Lycaena hippothoe, purple-edged copper
 Lycaena phlaeas, small copper
 Lycaena tityrus, sooty copper
 Lycaena virgaureae, scarce copper
Polyommatinae
 Agriades glandon aquilo, Arctic blue - protected by law
 Agriades optilete, cranberry blue
 Aricia artaxerxes, northern brown argus
 Aricia nicias, silvery argus
 Celastrina argiolus, holly blue
 Cupido alcetas, Provençal short-tailed blue
 Cupido argiades, short-tailed blue
 Cupido minimus, small blue
 Cyaniris semiargus, Mazarine blue
 Eumedonia eumedon, geranium argus
 Glaucopsyche alexis, green-underside blue
 Phengaris arion, large blue - protected by law
 Plebejus argus, silver-studded blue
 Plebejus idas, northern blue
 Polyommatus amandus, Amanda's blue
 Polyommatus icarus, common blue
 Pseudophilotes vicrama, chequered blue - protected by law
 Scolitantides orion, chequered blue butterfly - protected by law
Theclinae
 Callophrys rubi, green hairstreak
 Neozephyrus quercus, purple hairstreak
 Satyrium pruni, black hairstreak
 Satyrium w-album, white-letter hairstreak
 Thecla betulae, brown hairstreak

Nymphalidae 
Apaturinae
 Apatura ilia, lesser purple emperor
 Apatura iris, purple emperor
Heliconiinae
 Argynnis laodice, Pallas' fritillary
 Argynnis paphia, silver-washed fritillary
 Speyeria aglaja, dark green fritillary
 Fabriciana adippe, high brown fritillary
 Fabriciana niobe, Niobe fritillary
 Boloria aquilonaris, cranberry fritillary
 Boloria chariclea, Arctic fritillary
 Boloria freija, Freija fritillary
 Boloria frigga, Frigga fritillary
 Boloria eunomia, bog fritillary
 Boloria euphrosyne, pearl-bordered fritillary
 Boloria improba, dingy fritillary - protected by law
 Boloria napaea, mountain fritillary
 Boloria polaris, polaris fritillary
 Boloria selene, small pearl-bordered fritillary
 Boloria thore, Thor's fritillary - protected by law south from Kainuu
 Boloria titania, titania's fritillary - protected by law
 Brenthis ino, lesser marbled fritillary
 Issoria lathonia, Queen of Spain fritillary
Limenitidinae
 Limenitis camilla, white admiral
 Limenitis populi, poplar admiral
Nymphalinae
 Aglais io, European peacock
 Aglais urticae, small tortoiseshell
 Araschnia levana, map
 Euphydryas aurinia, marsh fritillary - protected by law
 Euphydryas intermedia
 Euphydryas iduna, Lapland fritillary
 Euphydryas maturna, scarce fritillary - protected by law
 Melitaea athalia, heath fritillary
 Melitaea cinxia, Glanville fritillary
 Melitaea diamina, false heath fritillary - protected by law
 Nymphalis antiopa, mourning cloak
 Nymphalis polychloros, large tortoiseshell
 Nymphalis vaualbum, Compton tortoiseshell
 Nymphalis xanthomelas, scarce tortoiseshell
 Polygonia c-album, comma
 Vanessa atalanta, red admiral
 Vanessa cardui, painted lady
Satyrinae
 Hipparchia semele, grayling
 Lopinga achine, woodland brown - protected by law
 Lasiommata petropolitana, northern wall brown
 Lasiommata megera, speckled wood
 Lasiommata maera, large wall
 Pararge aegeria tircis, speckled wood
 Hyponephele lycaon, dusky meadow brown
 Aphantopus hyperantus, ringlet
 Maniola jurtina, meadow brown
 Coenonympha glycerion, chestnut heath
 Coenonympha pamphilus, small heath
 Coenonympha hero, scarce heath
 Coenonympha tullia, large heath
 Erebia euryale euryaloides, large ringlet
 Erebia disa, Arctic ringlet
 Erebia pandrose, dewy ringlet
 Erebia ligea, Arran brown
 Erebia medusa polaris, woodland ringlet - protected by law
 Erebia embla, Lapland ringlet
 Oeneis bore, Arctic grayling
 Oeneis jutta, Baltic grayling
 Oeneis norna, nose grayling

Hesperiidae (skippers) 
Heteropterinae
 Carterocephalus palaemon, chequered skipper
 Carterocephalus silvicola, northern chequered skipper
 Heteropterus morpheus, large chequered skipper
Hesperiinae
 Hesperia comma, silver-spotted skipper - northern subspecies protected by law
 Ochlodes sylvanus, large skipper
 Thymelicus lineola, Essex skipper
Pyrginae
 Pyrgus alveus, large grizzled skipper
 Pyrgus andromedae, Alpine grizzled skipper
 Pyrgus centaureae, northern grizzled skipper
 Pyrgus malvae, grizzled skipper

References

External links 
 The first and the last records of Macrolepidopteran species in Finnish biogeographical provinces  (partially outdated)

See also
List of moths of Finland

Finland
Finland
Finland
Butterflies